Nemesignis is a genus of sea slugs, aeolid nudibranchs, marine gastropod mollusks in the family Myrrhinidae with only one species, Nemesignis banyulensis.

Distribution
This species is found in the Mediterranean Sea and adjacent Atlantic Ocean.

References

External links
 

 
Taxa described in 2021